The 2014 French Athletics Championships was the 126th edition of the national championship in outdoor track and field for France. It was held on 11–13 July at the Stade Georges-Hébert in Reims. A total of 38 events (divided evenly between the sexes) were contested over the three-day competition.

Results

Men

Women

References

Results
 Les championnats de France 2014 

French Athletics Championships
French Athletics Championships
French Athletics Championships
French Athletics Championships
Sport in Reims